Metal is the sixth album by French composer Pierre Estève and was released in 2001 by Shooting Star. It is the second album after Bamboo from Esteve's MADe IN series, based on matters from Chinese instrument classification.

Track listing

Personnel
Musicians
Pierre Estève
Ramon Fossati
Axel Lecourt
Alain Rouault

Release history

References

2001 albums
Pierre Estève albums